Fietta is an Italian surname. Notable people with the surname include:

Giovanni Fietta (born 1984), Italian footballer
Giuseppe Fietta (1883–1960), Italian cardinal

Italian-language surnames